My Sassy Girl 2 is a 2010 Chinese romantic comedy film directed by Joe Ma and starring Lynn Hung, Leon Jay Williams, He Jiong, Abby Feng and Bosco Wong. The film is an unofficial sequel of the 2001 South Korean film My Sassy Girl. It was released on November 5, 2010.

Cast
 Lynn Hung as Shangzhen
 Leon Jay Williams as Jianyu
 He Jiong as Zhikai
 Abby Feng as Yongzhen
 Bosco Wong as Yang Guo

Reception
On BeyondHollywood.com, James Mudge said the film "offers up an hour and a half of surprisingly effective comedy, a few touches of romance, and lots of scenes of aggressive women kicking the hell out of considerably less masculine men".

References

External links

HKcinemagic entry

2010 romantic comedy films
2010 films
2010s Cantonese-language films
Chinese romantic comedy films
Films directed by Joe Ma
Films set in China
Films set in South Korea
Chinese sequel films
Unofficial sequel films
2010s Mandarin-language films